Sabah Wildlife Department, a local wildlife authority under Sabah's state Ministry for Tourism Development, Environment, Science and Technology, enforces the "Wildlife Conservation Enactment 1997" for the proper regulation, use, protection, conservation and management of wildlife, caves and wildlife areas in Sabah. Headquartered in Kota Kinabalu, Malaysia, jurisdiction is spread amongst district offices:
 Keningau Wildlife District
 Lahad Datu Wildlife District
 Sandakan Wildlife District
 Tawau Wildlife District
 West Coast & Kudat Wildlife District

The Department is responsible for:
 Farming
 Filming
 Guides
 Honorary Wildlife Wardens
 Licensure
 Publications
 Research management
 Tour operators
 Trade
 Zoos

References

Further reading

 Sabah. Crocodile Management in Sabah ; Handbook for Crocodile Survey and Monitoring. Sabah, Malaysia: Sabah Wildlife, 2002. 
 Sabah. The Journal of Wildlife Management and Research Sabah. Sabah, Malaysia: Sabah Wildlife Dept, 1997.

External links
 Official website
 Wildlife Conservation Enactment (No. 6 of 1997)- Parts and Sections

Nature conservation in Malaysia